József Merényi (19 April 1928 – 28 January 2018) was a Hungarian speed skater. He competed in four events at the 1952 Winter Olympics.

References

1928 births
2018 deaths
Hungarian male speed skaters
Olympic speed skaters of Hungary
Speed skaters at the 1952 Winter Olympics
Speed skaters from Budapest